Friendship knot loop is a knot to tie a secure and stable loop at the end of a rope.

The slipped version where the last move is done with a bight of the end, rather than with the end itself, is one that can be tightened flat, slid, locked (like a belt buckle), and then untied quickly (like when nature calls) with an exploding pop. If not tightened flat, this  Slipped friendship knot loop collapses into a cube and will neither slide nor pop.

Tying
Like tying a friendship knot, except that it is tied to the ropes own end, coming back from forming the loop.

See also
List of knots
Friendship knot

References